product # bvcd 3482 (love gift) or Love Gift  is the third and final studio album by the Christian alternative rock band Breakfast with Amy, released in 1992. Love Gift was the band's last release on Blonde Vinyl Records, and ended up being one of the last 
releases by any record label owned by Michael Knott. The album is considered a concept album with random audio inserts, short phone conversations,
instrumental jams, and pre-song warm ups, as well as two self-described "dramas". Also included were two live songs from a previous tour. Musically, Love Gift continues with the punk/alternative rock sounds of their previous release Dad, and could be considered their most progressive album to date.

The original version of Love Gift was to be released on the Vox Vinyl label. The Vox Vinyl version of the album (most cuts were re-recorded for the Blonde Vinyl Records album) remains unreleased.

Track listing
All songs written by Breakfast with Amy.
 "[Sample - Listening Advice]" – 0:25
 "Ralph's Garage" – 2:39
 "[Sample Loop]" – 0:07
 "Jello Wiggle" – 2:57
 "Song Of The Humpback Whale" – 0:41
 "[Sample - Audio Balance Established]" – 0:05
 "Uniform Tree" – 5:04
 "Paul Calls Mr. Rhumba From A Plane" – 0:40
 "Velvety Dave At The Naugahyde Lounge" – 0:42
 "Voices" – 1:42
 "Little Maxine's Epiphany" - 4:48
 "Edwin Loves TX!" – 1:07
 "Fashion Gal" – 2:51
 "Toth Calls Rumby" – 0:14
 "[Accordion Warm-Up]" – 0:30
 "Jonas' Russian Accordion" – 1:24
 "The Tollhouse Waltz" – 4:00
 "Ad America (Baby Baby Baby Version)" – 3:07
 "Videos And Food" – 4:47
 "Mrs. Rhumba Calls Mr. Rhumba" – 0:16
 "Happy Song (Featuring Sol And Hank, The Metro Twins)" – 2:30
 "You (Live)" – 4:04
 "Social Studies (Live)" – 5:08
 "Mum Calls Dave" – 0:29

Personnel
 David Koval — vocals, electric sitar, acoustic guitar
 Edwin Wohler — bass guitar
 Christopher Colbert — guitar
 Caryn Colbert — guitar
 Paul Pelligrin — drums
 Michael J. Pritzl — acoustic guitar
 Christopher Colbert — engineer
 Mr. Rhumba — assistant engineer

Miscellaneous information
The track listing on the back of the album omits tracks 1, 3, 6, and 15.

1992 albums
Breakfast with Amy albums
Blonde Vinyl Records albums